Hendecaneura axiotima is a species of moth of the family Tortricidae. It is found in China (Sichuan, Yunnan, Tibet), Taiwan, India and Nepal.

References

Moths described in 1937
Eucosmini